Sam Ruby is a prominent software developer who has made significant contributions to web standards and open source software projects. In particular he has contributed to the standardization of syndicated web feeds via his involvement with the Atom standard and the Feed Validator web service.

He currently holds a Senior Technical Staff Member position in the Emerging Technologies Group of IBM and is on the board of the Apache Software Foundation. He resides in Raleigh, North Carolina.

Background
Sam Ruby received a B.A. in Mathematics from Christopher Newport University, Newport News, Virginia. Ruby was hired immediately out of college by IBM and has worked there since.

Apache Project
Ruby currently serves on the board of the Apache Software Foundation. He formerly served as President; Assistant Secretary; Director, Vice President of Legal Affairs; and was the former Chair of the Apache Jakarta Project. He also actively contributes to numerous Apache projects. Notably, he was one of the early Ant contributors, as well as being the creator of Gump.

Feed Validator
Ruby is the principal maintainer of the Feed validator, which he developed along with Mark Pilgrim. It's able to validate Atom feeds as well as RSS 0.90, 0.91, 0.92, 0.93, 0.94, 1.0, 1.1 and 2.0 feeds.

PHP
Ruby also contributed to PHP, in particular to the Java Extension.

Ruby
Sam Ruby has done development in the Ruby programming language, leading to some confusion between the person's name and the language. However, there is no formal connection—they both just coincidentally have the same name.

Venus
Ruby is the author of Venus, an Atom/RSS feed aggregator, the codebase that began as a radical refactoring of the Planet 2.0 feed aggregator in 2006.

html5lib
Ruby is a developer member of the html5lib project, with his primary contribution being the initial port of html5lib to the Ruby programming language.

Standardization efforts
Ruby has been active within various standards development organizations.

ECMA standardization of the .NET Framework CLI
Ruby was the convener of the ECMA TC49 group that standardized the Common Language Infrastructure for Microsoft's .NET Framework.

Atom
The project which eventually became the Atom web feed standard was started by a blog posting by Sam Ruby in 2002 entitled  "what makes a log entry".  This blog posting eventually became a wiki project which acted as a rallying point for people looking to improve upon the frozen RSS format.  Sam Ruby was the secretary of the IETF AtomPub working group.  This working group completed RFC 4287, the Atom format specification ("The Atom Syndication Format"), in December 2005 and RFC 5023, "The Atom Publishing Protocol", in October 2007.

ECMAScript
Ruby is a member of the ECMAScript technical committee (ECMAScript TC39); his primary contribution to the group is in driving the effort to add Decimal support to ECMAScript.

HTML5
Ruby was an early adopter of HTML5, and has offered a number of concrete proposals which were subsequently incorporated into the HTML5 draft. He has been appointed co-chair of the W3C's HTML Working Group from 5 January 2009.

Bibliography
Agile Web Development with Rails 5 (Pragmatic Bookshelf, 2016) (with Dave Thomas and David Heinemeier Hansson) 
Agile Web Development with Rails 4 (Pragmatic Bookshelf, 2013) (with Dave Thomas and David Heinemeier Hansson)  
RESTful Web APIs (O'Reilly Publishing, 2013) (with Leonard Richardson and Mike Amundsen) 
Agile Web Development with Rails 3.2 (Pragmatic Bookshelf, 2011) (with Dave Thomas and David Heinemeier Hansson) 
Agile Web Development with Rails, Third Edition (Pragmatic Bookshelf, 2009) (with Dave Thomas and David Heinemeier Hansson) 
RESTful Web Services (O'Reilly Publishing, 2007) (with Leonard Richardson)

See also
 Apache Software Foundation
 Atom (standard)

References

Sources

 Web services visionary - an interview with Sam Ruby (IBM developerworks)
 Sam Ruby on the O'Reilly Network
 SamRuby page on Atom Wiki - accessed February 22, 2006.
 ''Biography: Sam Ruby - from XML Conference and Expo 2003.

External links
 Intertwingly - Sam Ruby's weblog (the name is a reference to Ted Nelson's coinage "intertwingularity").
 Feed Validator - Sam Ruby's feed validator for Atom and RSS.

American bloggers
American computer scientists
Computer programmers
Christopher Newport University alumni
Living people
Year of birth missing (living people)
IBM employees
Open source advocates